Veronica Yip Yuk Hing (born February 12, 1967) is a Hong Kong-born American actress and singer who is probably most well known for her roles in Category III films.

Career

Film 
Veronica Yip was born in Portuguese Macau and started her career in participating in the 1985 Miss Asia Pageant and received the 2nd runner-up award. Her career breakthrough was when she starred in adult films which previously were considered taboo for mainstream actresses in the Hong Kong market. Yip has starred in a total of three of these Category III films: Take Me (1991), Pretty Woman (1992) and Hidden Desire (1992). All three films were regarded as commercial successes and paved the way for  mainstream actresses, such as Loletta Lee and Irene Wan to act in such films.

Aside from these films, Yip has also starred in many films critically acclaimed Chinese movies, including Jeffrey Lau's The Eagle Shooting Heroes and Stanley Kwan's Red Rose, White Rose (1994). Yip's ability to escape the soft porn market paving the way for actresses such as Shu Qi and Pauline Chan to do the same.

Music
Yip had a singing career when she joined Fitto Entertainment, owned by her brother Yip Chi-Ming, before the company was transitioned into Emperor Entertainment Group, releasing seven cantopop and mandopop albums between 1992 and 1995. Yip received three Best New Artist gold awards from 1992 Ultimate Song Chart Awards Presentation, 1992 RTHK Top 10 Gold Songs Awards, and 1992 Jade Solid Gold Best Ten Music Awards Presentation.

Family 
In 1998, Yip invested a large sum in her brother's project of building a Disneyland in Hong Kong. However, the project was scrapped along with the budget causing a fallout between the two. Yip and her brother later reconciled.

Yip met her husband, Chinese-American businessman Jeffrey Wu (胡兆明) when Yip was hired by Premier Entertainment in New York to perform a concert at the Trump Marina in Atlantic City. After marrying Wu in 1996, Yip retired from entertainment and moved to the United States where Wu runs the Hong Kong Supermarket chain. The couple have a daughter and two sons and currently reside on Long Island. They also have substantial investments in United International Bank, a business jet trading company, and various business-use real estate projects.

Political stance 
In November 2020, Yip mentioned that she was a Republican supporter and supported the second term of Donald Trump.

References

External links 

 HK cinemagic entry
 LoveHKfilm entry

1967 births
Living people
American bankers
American businesspeople in retailing
American investors
American real estate businesspeople
Businesspeople from New York (state)
Hong Kong bankers
Hong Kong emigrants to the United States
20th-century Hong Kong women singers
Hong Kong film actresses
Hong Kong financial businesspeople
Hong Kong investors
Hong Kong real estate businesspeople
Hong Kong retail businesspeople
Hong Kong television actresses
Hong Kong women in business
People from Long Island
20th-century Hong Kong actresses
American women investors
21st-century American businesswomen
21st-century American businesspeople
Macau-born Hong Kong artists